is a noted Japanese anime director, animation director and mecha and character designer.

Biography
After graduating from high school in 1985, Masami Obari began his career when he joined the animation studio Ashi Production, where he worked on shows such as Special Armored Battalion Dorvack, Transformers (outsourced by Toei Animation to them sometimes), and Star Musketeer Bismarck. Soon after, at the age of 19, he got his first major break when he landed the role of mecha designer on Dancouga – Super Beast Machine God. Not too long after, at the young age of 21, he was given his first directorial role by directing episodes 5 and 6 of the Bubblegum Crisis OVA series. He also made three Fatal Fury OVAs from December 23, 1992, to July 16, 1994.

In 1993, he founded Studio G-1 with fellow animators Kazuto Nakazawa, Masahiro Yamane, Takehiro Nakayama, and Atsuko Ishida, to whom Masami Obari was married, but from whom he is now divorced. Studio G-1 was later disbanded and was reformed under the name of Studio G-1 Neo in the year 2000.

Although not originally interested in animation, he was inspired when he formed a high school friendship with classmate Satoshi Urushihara

In 2016, Obari married the professional model maker Ritsu Togasaki.

He has a younger brother named Takami, who's currently serving as the president and CEO of New Japan Pro-Wrestling.

Filmography

Director

Original Video Animation 
 1988 Moonlight Rambler (Part 5 of Bubblegum Crisis)
 1989 Red Eyes (Part 6 of Bubblegum Crisis)
 1991–1992 Detonator Orgun
 1996 Battle Arena Toshinden
 1996 Voltage Fighter Gowcaizer
 1997–1998 Voogie's Angel (co-directed with Aoi Takenouchi)
 1999 Dangaizer 3
 2001–2003 Angel Blade
 2001–2003 Marine a Go Go
 2002 Viper GTS
 2004–2005 Angel Blade Punish!
 2017 Gundam Build Fighters: Battlogue
 2020 Gundam Build Divers Battlogue

Television series 
 1997 Virus Buster Serge
 2000 Platinumhugen Ordian
 2002 Gravion
 2004 Gravion Zwei
 2007 Jūsō Kikō Dancouga Nova
 2007 Prism Ark
 2010–2011 Super Robot Wars Original Generation: The Inspector
 2013 Bakujyuu Kasshin Ziguru Hazeru

Animated feature film 
 1994 Fatal Fury: The Motion Picture

Designer

Character design

Direct-to-video animation 
 1988-1990 Guy: Double Target (Monster Design)
 1990–1992 Guardian of Darkness (Monster Design)
 1993-1994 Time Bokan: Royal Revival (Key animation; episode 2)
 1996-1997 Voltage Fighter Gowcaizer
 1997–1998 Voogie's Angel
 2001–2003 Angel Blade (Monster Design)
 2004–2005 Angel Blade Punish!

Television series 
 1997 Virus Buster Serge
 1998 Weiss Kreuz (Animation director for the 1st opening sequence)

Animated feature film 
 1992 Fatal Fury: Legend of the Hungry Wolf
 1993 Fatal Fury 2: The New Battle
 1994 Fatal Fury: The Motion Picture

Video games 
 1995 Voltage Fighter Gowcaizer (also voices Brider in the game)
 2022 The King of Fighters XV

Mecha design

Direct-to-video animation 
 1985–1987 Fight! Iczer One
 1987–1991 Bubblegum Crisis (DD design)
 1987–1989 Dangaioh
 1999 Dangaizer 3
 2001–2003 Marine a Go Go

Television series 
 1985 Dancouga – Super Beast Machine God
 1991-1992 The Brave Fighter of Sun Fighbird (chief animator, mecha designer for 9 episodes, opening sequence solo animator)
 1992-1993 Tekkaman Blade (opening sequence animator)
 1994-1995 Magic Knight Rayearth (opening sequence animator)
 1994–1995 Brave Police J-Decker (Guest Mecha Design for episodes 1–3)
 2000 Platinumhugen Ordian
 2002 Gravion
 2004 Gravion Zwei
 2007 Jūsō Kikō Dancouga Nova
 2010–2011 Super Robot Wars Original Generation: The Inspector
 2015-2017 Mobile Suit Gundam: Iron-Blooded Orphans (Animation direction, key animation, in-between animation)
 2019 Pop Team Epic TV Special (1st half prologue skit and opening sequence)
 2022 Pop Team Epic Series 2 (Episode 2 story part and ending sequence)

Video games 
 1989 Moto Roader
 2007 Super Robot Wars: Original Generations
 2007 Super Robot Wars Original Generation Gaiden
 2008 Super Robot Wars Z
 2012 2nd Super Robot Wars Z
 2015 3rd Super Robot Wars Z
 2018 Mobile Corps Iron Saga
 2019 Super Robot Wars DD

Bibliography
 G-One Masami Obari's Super Design Works First Mission (G-ONE 大張正己作品集). Movic, 1998. 
 Masami Obari Artworks Robot Soul (大張正己 画集 ロボ魂-ROBOT SOUL-). SB Creative, 2013. 
 Masami Obari Art Book OBARISM (大張正己画集 OBARISM). Hobby Japan, 2022.

References

External links
 
 
 Masami Obari anime works at Media Arts Database 

Sunrise (company) people
1966 births
Living people
Japanese animated film directors
Anime directors
Anime character designers
Mechanical designers (mecha)
Japanese animators
People from Hiroshima Prefecture
Place of birth missing (living people)
Brave series